Brian Pearson may refer to:

Brian Pearson, singer in The Critics Group
Brian Pearson, cinematographer of The Karate Dog

See also
Bryan Pearson (disambiguation)